The 2022 Los Angeles mayoral election was held on November 8, 2022, to elect the mayor of Los Angeles, California. A top-two primary was held on June 7, 2022. Candidates could win the election outright by receiving more than 50% of the vote, but no candidate received a majority. More than forty candidates formed committees to run. Twenty-seven filed their declaration of intention to collect signatures for the ballot, and of these twelve qualified.

Incumbent Mayor Eric Garcetti was ineligible to seek a third term due to term limits but was serving an extended second term due to a law moving election dates. In July 2021, Garcetti was nominated to become United States Ambassador to India. If Garcetti left office before his mayoral term ended, the Los Angeles City Council would have appointed an interim replacement to finish the remainder of that term. This nomination was stalled in the Senate, leaving Garcetti to finish his term. 

U.S. Representative Karen Bass and real estate developer Rick Caruso advanced to the general election. On November 16, Bass was declared the winner becoming the first woman, as well as the second black, mayor of Los Angeles.

There were a total of 2,120,515 registered voters within the City of Los Angeles and 1,018,139 votes received as of November 22, 2022 as of the last update there were 15,105 ballots outstanding within Los Angeles County, The election was nonpartisan, as are all local elections in California.

Candidates

Advanced to general election 
 Rick Caruso, CEO of Caruso Affiliated, developer of The Grove at Farmers Market and The Americana at Brand, president of the University of Southern California board of trustees, former president of the Los Angeles Board of Police Commissioners, and former member of the Los Angeles Board of Water and Power and the Los Angeles Coliseum Commission

Eliminated in primary 
 Kevin de León, city councilmember from the 14th district, candidate for the US Senate in 2018 and former President pro tempore of the California State Senate
 Craig Greiwe, business executive
 Alex Gruenenfelder Smith, Echo Park neighborhood councilman
 John "Jsamuel" Jackson, business owner
 Andrew Kim, lawyer
 Gina Viola, community organizer/activist
 Mel Wilson, real estate agent and former Metro board member

Disqualified 
 Louis De Barraicua, teacher and self-described homeless advocate
 Barry "Boenvilla" Boen, CEO of SilentRight
 Chuck Cho
 YJ Draiman, former Northridge East Neighborhood Councilmember
 Austin Dragon, veteran and education advocate
 Sean Enright, construction worker
 Jesse N. Forte, self-described astronaut
 Chris Gilmore, business owner
 Jesseca Harvey, business administrative consultant
 Evan Jasek, web developer
 G. Juan Johnson, housing advocate (write-in)
 Juanita Lopez, businesswoman
 Alicia Tashaunna Lowery, children's social worker
 Asher Luzzatto, developer
 William "Rodriguez" Morrison, community organizer and perennial candidate (write-in)
 Jemiss Nazar, chiropractor
 Vincent "King Spider-D" Willis, community activist

Withdrawn 
 Joseph May, urban designer, artist, and entrepreneur (endorsed Caruso)
 Helan Mahmood, co-founder of fashion brand Don Kaka
 Jessica Lall, business executive (endorsed Caruso)
 Joe Buscaino, city councilmember from the 15th district and former LAPD officer (remained on ballot; endorsed Caruso)
 Mike Feuer, Los Angeles City Attorney and former state assemblyman from the 42nd district (remained on ballot; endorsed Bass)
 Ramit Varma, co-founder of Revolution Prep (remained on ballot; endorsed Caruso)

Declined 
 Austin Beutner, former superintendent of the Los Angeles Unified School District and 2013 mayoral candidate
 Mike Bonin, city councilmember from the 11th district 
 Bob Iger, CEO of The Walt Disney Company
 Paul Krekorian, city councilmember from the 2nd district and former state assemblyman from the 43rd district
 Steve Lopez, journalist
 Nury Martinez, President of the Los Angeles City Council from the 6th district
 Mark Ridley-Thomas, suspended city councilmember from the 10th district and former Los Angeles County Supervisor

Primary

Campaign 

With an open race for mayor, Karen Bass announced that she would retire from Congress and run for Los Angeles mayor. Bass was widely seen as the favorite frontrunner with other moderates and progressives polling much lower and divided amongst themselves. The wide lead led to speculation that Bass would have been able to avoid a runoff all together. Real estate developer Rick Caruso had announced that he would run after speculation in past races and polled in the single digits. However, during the spring of 2022, Caruso saw a surge of support rivaling that of Bass.

As the primary neared, many prominent candidates dropped out and endorsed the two frontrunners, Bass representing the progressive element of the race and Caruso representing the moderate element. This had been shown with two former mayoral candidates: Joe Buscaino, a City Councilmember, endorsed Caruso, and Mike Feuer, the Los Angeles City Attorney, endorsed Bass. Councilmember Kevin de León also had significant support but lagged behind Bass and Caruso, and ultimately did not advance to the general election.

Debates 
On December 12, 2021, the Stonewall Democratic Club hosted a forum with candidates Bass, Feuer, Lall, and Greiwe. Buscaino and de León cancelled last minute due to scheduling conflicts. On February 22, 2022, Loyola Marymount University alongside Spectrum News 1 hosted the first formal debate between candidates, with Caruso absent because of a scheduling issue. During the debate, protesters started heckling them, resulting in them attempting to rush the stage near the end of the debate.

On March 22, 2022, FOX 11 along with the Los Angeles Times hosted a debate at the University of Southern California with Bass, Buscaino, Caruso, de León, and Feuer. Although most of the other candidates attacked Caruso, many people said that Caruso had won the debate.

On April 28, 2022, ABC7 announced that they would be hosting a debate at California State University, Los Angeles with the top five leading candidates. In response to the list, candidates Craig Greiwe, Alex Gruenenfelder Smith, Gina Viola, and Mel Wilson criticized their exclusion at the debates and the organizers. Candidate Ramit Varma later released a statement criticizing his exclusion at debates. During the Sunday debate, police removed Melina Abdullah, a professor at Cal State LA and Black Lives Matter founder, as well as other protesters from the room as they did not have a tickets to the event.

The issues talked at the debates were homelessness, the COVID-19 pandemic in the United States, crime, and climate change.

Mayoral debates and forums

Endorsements

Polling
Graphical summary

Results

Runoff

Debates

Endorsements 
Endorsements in bold were made after the primary election.

Polling 
Graphical summary

Results

See also 

2022 California elections
2022 California gubernatorial election
2022 United States Senate election in California
2022 Los Angeles elections

Notes

References

External links
Official campaign websites
 Karen Bass for Mayor
 Joe Buscaino for Mayor (withdrew from race)
 Rick Caruso for Mayor
 Kevin de León for Mayor
 YJ Draiman for Mayor (did not qualify for ballot)
 Sean Enright for Mayor (did not qualify for ballot)
 Mike Feuer for Mayor (withdrew from race)
 Alex Gruenenfelder Smith for Mayor
 Craig Greiwe for Mayor
John Jackson for Mayor
 G. Juan Johnson for Mayor (did not qualify for ballot)
 Andrew Kim for Mayor
 Jessica Lall for Mayor (withdrew from race)
 Mel Wilson for Mayor

Mayoral election
Los Angeles mayoral
Mayoral elections in Los Angeles
Los Angeles